Tall Rizi-ye Alivand (also Romanized as Tall Rīzī-ye ‘Ālīvand and Tol Rīzī-ye ‘Ālīvand; also known as Tall Rīzī) is a village in Bakesh-e Yek Rural District, in the Central District of Mamasani County, Fars Province, Iran. At the 2006 census, its population was 402, in 82 families.

References 

Populated places in Mamasani County